Haatim Tai is a 1990 Indian Hindustani-language fantasy film, produced by Ratan Mohan under the R.M. Art Productions banner and directed by Babubhai Mistri. It stars Jeetendra, Sangeeta Bijlani and has music composed by Laxmikant Pyarelal, and lyrics by Hasan Kamal. The film's plot is based on the real life story of Hatim al-Tai, who was a famous Arabian poet from the Ta'i Arabian tribe. He is an icon to Arabs up till the present day for being extremely generous and brave.

Plot 
The film begins with a baby boy being born into the household of a rich Arab King. The Prince is named Hatim al-Tai and is a very generous and humble Prince when he reaches adulthood. As the Prince begins distributing gold to poor citizens in his city, a Princess named Mariam comes to his doorstep to ask him for help. She tells him that she is in love with a Prince named Munir and they want to get married, but her father will not let her marry anyone as long as she lives. Hatim is shocked at her father's decision and realizes that there must be a reason behind it. Hatim, his friend Nazrul, Mariam and Munir go to Mariam's palace to ask the King why he will not let his daughter marry anyone. The King tells them of an event that occurred in the past, which leads to the reason why Mariam cannot get married.

One day as the King was sleeping in his luxurious room, a fairy named Gulnar Pari flew into his room enchanted by the beautiful chandeliers in his room. Upon seeing the beautiful Fairy, the King is aroused by her beauty and attempts to rape her, but fails as Gulnar Pari is cursed and slowly begins turning into stone to save her honor. She gives him a curse that whoever his daughter Mariam marries, will die on the wedding night and Mariam will turn into stone. As Gulnar Pari begins turning into stone, the King begs for forgiveness. She pities him and leaves seven questions he needs or someone else has to answer. All the questions need to be answered in order to get rid of both Gulnar Pari and Mariam's curses.

When the King's story ends, he shows Hatim, Nazrul, Mariam and Munir the beautiful stone statue of Gulnar Pari. Hatim decides to seek answers to the seven questions. The King warns Hatim that the questions are extremely difficult and he will have to travel to distant and dangerous places. Hatim promises that with the company of his friend Nazrul, he will answer the seven questions. Hatim and Nazrul begin to travel seeking answers to the seven questions. Slowly they start solving these questions. Every time a question is answered, a part of Gulnar Pari comes back to life. While seeking the answers to the questions, Hatim comes across a fairy that looks exactly like Gulnar Pari. She reveals that she is Gulnar Pari's twin sister, Pari Bano. She thanks Hatim for his help and they both fall in love. Hatim and Nazrul begin completing the questions with the help of Gulnar Pari and succeed in completing all the difficult questions. Gulnar Pari comes back to life and Mariam's curse is lifted as well. Hatim, Pari Bano, Mariam and Munir celebrate and begin preparing for their weddings.

In the last quest, Hatim comes face to face with Magician (Jadoogar) Kamlaq. Kamlaq's trademark words are, "Jinn Jinn Jinn du Jinn daara". He is the final hurdle to Hatim's completion of the seven quests.

Cast 

 Jeetendra as Hatim al-Tai
 Sangeeta Bijlani as Gulnar Angel / Husna Angel
 Satish Shah  as Nazrul
 Alok Nath as King of Angel land
 Raza Murad as Barzat
 Sonu Walia as Saira
 Amrish Puri  as Magician Kamlaq
 Dev Kumar  as Chieftain
 Rajesh Vivek as Departed
 Vijayendra Ghatge as Munir
 Goga Kapoor as Mendicant
 Joginder as Bandit
 Jasmin as Fairy
 Shamshuddin as Monster
 Dheeraj as Peracholly

Soundtrack 
Hasan Kamal write all the songs.

References 
 ^ Biography of Sheikh Bahi Dadiza (Arabic)
 ^ Kitab al-Aghani by Abu al-Faraj al-Isfahani
 ^ E. J. Brill's First Encyclopaedia of Islam, 1913–1936
 ^ https://web.archive.org/web/20151102080822/http://persian.packhum.org/persian/pf?file=08501030&ct=0
 ^ https://books.google.com/books?id=s_4KV4Ixq4IC&pg=PA132&dq=Hatim+Tai#PPA132,M1
 ^ Persian Portraits: A Sketch of Persian History, Literature and Politics by F. F. Arbuthnot
 ^ https://www.imdb.com/title/tt0242509/plotsummary?ref_=tt_ov_pl

External links 
 

1990 films
1990s Hindi-language films
Indian fantasy adventure films
Films based on One Thousand and One Nights
Films directed by Babubhai Mistry
Films scored by Laxmikant–Pyarelal
1990s fantasy adventure films